James Indus Farley (February 24, 1871 – June 16, 1948) was an American educator, businessman, and a three-term member of the United States Congress from Indiana from 1933 to 1939.

Biography 
Born on a farm near Hamilton, Indiana, he attended Tri-State College in nearby Angola, and  Simpson College in Indianola, Iowa.  After four years of teaching school, he went to work for the Auburn Automobile Company and rose to become the company's president.

Political career
In 1928, he entered politics as a delegate to the Democratic National Convention.  He was elected to Congress in 1932 from the Fourth District, defeating incumbent Republican David Hogg.  He was re-elected twice before losing to Republican George W. Gillie in 1938.

Death
He died in Bryn Mawr, Pennsylvania, and is buried in Woodlawn Cemetery, Auburn, Indiana.

External links

1871 births
1948 deaths
People from Auburn, Indiana
People from Steuben County, Indiana
Democratic Party members of the United States House of Representatives from Indiana
Trine University alumni
Simpson College alumni
Schoolteachers from Indiana
Businesspeople from Indiana